Dream "A"live is the eighth studio album by Japanese boy band, Arashi. The album was released on April 23, 2008, in Japan under their record label J Storm in two editions: a limited 2CD version and a regular CD version. Dream "A"live is the 30th best-selling album of 2008 in Japan. As of July 2010, the album is the group's third highest-selling album after their tenth anniversary album All the Best! 1999–2009 and debut album Arashi No.1 Ichigou: Arashi wa Arashi o Yobu!. It was released digitally on February 7, 2020.

Album information
The album contains the singles "Happiness", which was used as the theme song for the drama Yamada Tarō Monogatari, and "Step and Go". Although production of the album began during the release of "Happiness", word of the new album did not surface until March 2008 when the album available for pre-order on online stores, with the two editions even reaching as high as the top two spots on CDJapan's Pre-Order Ranking.

Title
During Sho Sakurai's radio show Sho Beat on March 2, 2008, it was revealed that the Dream "A" Live title was created by Sakurai and Jun Matsumoto. The original title was "Alive", but was then purposely divided into "A live" to indicate the group's name and the live performance. Matsumoto also added "Dream" to the title to signify how "dreams can turn into reality" because the coincided Arashi Marks 2008 Dream-A-Live tour was considered a major achievement, as only two other Johnny's groups had previously performed a five-dome tour.

Critical reception

Adam Greenberg on AllMusic gave Dream "A"live three out of five stars, calling it a "decent album throughout, well-crafted and well-performed".

Aside from topping the sales rankings, Oricon also reported that the album was a hit with male buyers. Even men in the 40-year-old age bracket had planned to buy the album, compared to the interest with the group's previous album. The music statistics group attributed the group's increasing fan base to their primetime variety program  and the various dramas and commercials that the members have appeared in. It was considered quite a development, since many promotions and releases of Johnny's artists are geared towards female teens and young adults.

Commercial performance
The album debuted at the number one on the Oricon singles daily chart upon its release with the sales index number of 57,795 (about 101,000 copies). By the end of its first week, the album sold a total of 220,722 copies. The album ranked as the 30th best-selling album of 2008 in Japan, selling 303,727 by the end of the year.

On January 1, 2009, the album was placed at number 38 on Billboard Japan's 2008 Top Albums Year-End list.

Track listing

Personnel

Musicians

Arashi
Masaki Aiba – vocals
Jun Matsumoto – vocals
Kazunari Ninomiya – vocals
Satoshi Ohno – vocals
Sho Sakurai – vocals
Masayuki Iwata -  Arrangement ,Keyboard ,Electric guitar ,Chorus
Jun Abe – piano, keyboard
Akira – choir, chorus
Tanakam Ayuko – choir, chorus
Melvin Lee Davis – electric bass
Naoki Hayashibe – acoustic guitar
Masato Ishinari – acoustic guitar, electric guitar, electric sitar
Gen Strings Ittetsu – strings
Ikuo Kakehashi – percussion
Daisuke Kawai – organ
Takahiro Miyazaki – alto saxophone
Susumu Nishikawa – acoustic guitar, electric guitar
Hideaki Sakai – percussion
Satoshi Sano – trombone, chromatic harmonica
Shiro Sasaki – trumpet
Yasushi Sasamoto – keyboard
Hiroomi Shitara – acoustic guitar, electric guitar
Masanori Suzuki – trumpet
Tetsuya Takahashi – keyboard, choir, chorus
Takeshi Taneda – electric bass
Tomohiko Tsuya – choir, chorus
Jun Usuba – tenor saxophone
Ryoji Yamashiki – electric bass

Production

Jun Abe – programming
Takeshi Hanzawa – photography
Gen Strings Ittetsu – string arrangements
Julie K. – producer
Hiroshi Kawasaki – mastering
Mike Rose
Yasushi Sasamoto – programming	
Tsutomu Satomi – coordination
Tetsuya Takahashi – programming
Akitomo Takakuwa – engineer, mixing
Takao – stylist
Shigeru Tanida – engineer, mixing
Noboru Tomizawa – make-up, hair stylist
Asuka Tozawa – coordination
Alfred Tuohey 	
Carl Utbult 	
Youth Case – lyricist, composer

Charts and certifications

Weekly charts

Year-end charts

Sales and certifications

Release history

References

External links
Dream "A"live product information
[ Dream "A"live personnel]

Arashi albums
2008 albums
J Storm albums